The 2001 FIA GT Championship was the fifth season of FIA GT Championship, an auto racing series endorsed by the Fédération Internationale de l'Automobile (FIA) and organized by the Stéphane Ratel Organisation (SRO). The races featured grand touring cars divided into two categories and awarded drivers and teams championships and cups for each category. The season began on 31 March 2001 and ended on 21 October 2001 after eleven races held in Europe, and included for the first time the Spa 24 Hours as a premiere endurance event for the series.

Christophe Bouchut and Jean-Philippe Belloc of France won the FIA GT Drivers' Championship, while their team Larbre Compétition-Chereau were the teams champions, both earning five race victories including at Spa.  David Terrien and Christian Pescatori of JMB Competition won the N-GT Cups after six race wins.

Schedule
The SRO Group reached an agreement with Eurosport, the promoter and broadcaster of the European Touring Car Championship, in which both series would share identical calendars.  The events were promoted by Eurosport as the Super Racing Weekend, giving both series equal promotion and television coverage.  The Formula Renault 2000 Eurocup was also included as a support series for all events.  The only exception to this format would be the Spa 24 Hours, added to the FIA GT calendar as a stand-alone event, separate from the ETCC, after formerly holding touring car races for several decades.  The addition of Spa marked the return of endurance racing to the championship for the first time since 1998 and expanded the calendar from ten to eleven events.  Much of the rest of the schedule remained the same, although some races were moved to different times of the year.  Monza returned to the opening of the season, as it had been in 1999, and Brno and Magny-Cours moved from the end of the season to the second and third rounds respectively.  This moved the Spanish and Portuguese events to the end of the year, with Jarama replacing Valencia for the Spanish event.  The Nürburgring also returned to the series for the first time since 1997 as the sole German event, replacing EuroSpeedway Lausitz.  All events, with the exception of Spa, retained their  distance format.

Entries

GT

N-GT

Results and standings

Race results

Points were awarded to the top six finishers in each category.  Entries were required to complete 75% of the race distance in order to be classified as a finisher.  Drivers were required to complete 20% of the total race distance for their car to earn points.  Teams scored points for all cars that finished a race.  For the Spa 24 Hours, points were doubled.

Driver championships

GT Championship
The title was awarded jointly to Christophe Bouchut and Jean-Philippe Belloc who shared the wheel of the No. 7 Larbre Compétition–Chereau Chrysler Viper GTS-R.

N-GT Cup
The title was awarded jointly to Christian Pescatori and David Terrien who drove the No. 62 JMB Competition Ferrari 360 Modena N-GT.

Team championships

GT Championship

N-GT Cup

References

External links
 Official FIA GT homepage
 Motorsport Almanac
 Racing Sports Cars
 Sporting Regulations Retrieved from web.archive.org on 26 February 2009
 Points Tables  Retrieved from www.fiagt.com on 26 February 2009

FIA GT Championship
FIA GT Championship seasons